The Betsafe Cup was a summer football friendly tournament played twice in 2014 and 2015. In 2014 only two teams participated in the competition, which was hosted by German club FC Ingolstadt 04, who played against 1. FC Köln (Germany). The second edition in 2015 took place in Austria with four teams: 1. FC Köln, Kasımpaşa S.K., SC Cambuur and Espanyol Barcelona.

2014

Match

2015

Matches

Standings

External links 

2014–15 in German football
2015–16 in Spanish football
2015–16 in German football
2015–16 in Dutch football
2015–16 in Turkish football